The Jews (original title: Ils sont partout, or "They Are Everywhere") is a 2016 French-language film directed by Yvan Attal. The film deals with antisemitism in France.

Synopsis
Yvan hears himself saying that he exaggerates and is paranoid when he talks about the growing antisemitism. He decides to consult his shrink to talk about his identity and understand what it means today to be French and Jewish. During the dialogue, crossed stories, cynical and provocative, are exposed in the form of leaflets.

Cast
Benoît Poelvoorde as Boris
Valérie Bonneton as Eva
Dany Boon as Pascal
Charlotte Gainsbourg as Mathilde
Grégory Gadebois as a Talmudist #1
Denis Podalydès as a Talmudist #2
Gilles Lellouche as Norbert
François Damiens as Roger
Yvan Attal as Yvan
Freya Mavor as Marie
Émilie Gavois-Kahn as Rabbi's wife

References

External links

2016 films
2010s French-language films
Films about antisemitism
Films directed by Yvan Attal
Jewish comedy and humor
French comedy films
2016 comedy films
Antisemitism in France
Films produced by Thomas Langmann
2010s French films